Dubordieu was an unprotected cruiser built for the French Navy in the early 1880s. Intended to serve as a long-range commerce raider, the ship was fitted with a sailing rig to supplement its steam engine on long voyages, and she carried an armament of four  and twelve  guns. She was among the final French unprotected cruisers, thereafter being replaced by more durable protected cruisers. The French Navy was not satisfied with the vessel, owing to her obsolescent design, since she too weak to defeat the more powerful protected cruisers and was too slow to escape from them.

The ship served as the flagship of the Pacific station after entering service in 1889, but was forced to return home the following year to correct defects in her propulsion system. Dubourdieu returned to the Pacific later in 1890 and served there for the next several years. She was recalled home by 1895, and the next year she became the flagship of the North Atlantic station, a role she filled through 1899. The ship was placed in reserve in May that year, before being converted into a training ship; she was quickly sold to ship breakers in 1900.

Design
In the late 1870s, the French Navy had embarked on a program of cruiser construction based on a strategy aimed at attacking British merchant shipping in the event of war. The design for Dubourdieu traces its origin to discussions over the preceding French cruiser,  in February 1878. He was particularly concerned with the expense of earlier, large cruisers like , the cost of which would likely preclude building them in large numbers. Firepower would be considerable, consisting of either four  or six  guns and at least twelve  guns. As the French Navy only had two vessels that met the recommended criteria, the  argued that more should be built.

In addition, the Arethusé type was insufficiently armed to be able to engage foreign counterparts like the British  or the German . The Admiralty Council called for four new cruisers suited to the task be built. The naval constructor Pierre Gaston Hermann Valin, who had designed the cruiser , prepared an improved version of that ship to meet the Navy's requirements. He lengthened the hull, which created room for a more powerful propulsion system and additional guns. In January 1880, two ships of the design were allocated to the 1881 construction program; the first, to become Dubourdieu, and the second, was to be named Capitaine Lucas. The following year, a third vessel of the class was added to the budget, though this vessel was never named.

During construction, Louis-Émile Bertin submitted a proposal for a new steel-hulled cruiser with an armor deck, a type that would become known as the protected cruiser. The  rejected his proposal on 4 August 1881, but the naval minister, Georges Charles Cloué, overruled their decision shortly thereafter. He ordered the second and third Dubourdieu-class cruisers to be suspended and Bertin's ship to be built in their place. Dubourdieu and the three vessels of the Arethusé type were the final generation of unprotected cruisers built in France, that type thereafter being replaced by protected cruisers in the early 1880s, beginning with Bertin's ship, which became .

In addition to being the last unprotected cruiser of the French fleet, Dubourdieu was to be the last wooden-hulled cruiser to be built in France. France was among the last countries to build wooden-hulled cruisers, along with the United States; the French Navy preferred the use of wood, both because it was cheaper than steel, and it also allowed steel production to be concentrated on the ironclad warships then being built. The ship was poorly regarded as a result of her dated design; she was significantly weaker than the new protected cruisers that began to enter service in foreign navies by the time she was completed. She was also too slow to escape more powerful vessels. Admiral Jules François Émile Krantz is believed to have remarked that Dubourdieu was "nothing more than nice accommodations."

Characteristics

She displaced  normally. Her hull was constructed with wood; she had a clipper bow and an overhanging stern. The ship had no armor protection. Her crew consisted of 422 officers and enlisted men.

The ship was propelled by a single horizontal, 3-cylinder compound steam engine that drove a screw propeller. Steam was provided by twelve coal-burning fire-tube boilers that were ducted into a single funnel located amidships. The ship's engines proved to be troublesome in service, a common problem with French cruisers of the period. To supplement her steam engines, she was fitted with a three-masted full ship rig.

The ship was armed with a main battery of four  M1881 28-caliber guns that were placed in sponsons on the upper deck, two per side. These were supported by a secondary battery of twelve  M1881 30-caliber guns, ten of which were placed in a central gun battery on the main deck. The remaining two 138.6 mm guns were located aft. For close-range defense against torpedo boats, she carried a tertiary battery of a single  gun and ten  Hotchkiss revolver cannon. Dubourdieu was also fitted with two  torpedo tubes in above-water mounts, one on each broadside. The ship carried a pair of  field guns that could be sent ashore with a landing party.

Service history

Dubourdieu was built at the Arsenal de Cherbourg; she was ordered on 24 December 1879 and her keel was laid down on 6 September 1880. She was launched on 6 December 1884. Delays with the design and manufacturing of the steam engines slowed work on the ship, and she was finally completed in 1886, being commissioned for sea trials on 15 June. After conducting her full-power trials on 9 September, she was placed in reserve. Further trials were carried out, beginning on 6 June 1887, and after defects were discovered during a test run on 16 July, she was placed in the 3rd category of reserve for alterations on 10 August. She carried out further trials and was moved to the 2nd category of reserve on 22 December, at which point the ship was pronounced complete. At some point during the trials period, Dubourdieu received additional alterations, including the installation of admiral's quarters to allow the vessel to serve as a flagship. 

On 18 November 1889, Dubourdieu was recommissioned to deploy to the Pacific station, replacing the cruiser  as the flagship there. The ship's arrival was delayed when engine damage forced her to return to Cherbourg for repairs on 15 February 1890. She departed again on 10 April. The ship sailed south through the Atlantic, rounded Cape Horn, and made calls in a series of ports along the way, including in Chile, Peru, and the Hawaiian Kingdom, before reaching Tahiti in French Polynesia. From 30 June to 23 July 1891, the ship was dry docked at the Mare Island Naval Shipyard for repairs to her stern. During the early 1890s, the ships were primarily responsible for patrolling the French colonies in the Pacific. Later that year, Dubourdieu was recalled to France, where she was placed in reserve through 1895.

After recommissioning in 1896, Dubourdieu was assigned to the North American station to serve as its flagship, along with the unprotected cruiser . The following year, Roland was replaced by the unprotected cruiser , with Dubourdieu still the flagship. In May that year, Dubourdieu steamed to Cherbourg to undergo an overhaul and receive a new crew before resuming her role as the station flagship.

She remained on the station into 1899, by which time she had been joined by the protected cruiser Sfax. By that time, Dubourdieu flew the flag of Rear Admiral Escande. She arrived in Brest on 16 April, where Escande hauled down his flag. Four days later, the ship moved to Lorient, where she was later paid off into reserve on 9 May. She was struck from the naval register on 1 December that year and was briefly used as a stationary training ship. Dubourdieu was soon sold for scrap on 19 May 1900 to M. Degoul at Lorient and broken up.

Footnotes

Notes

Citations

References
 
 
 
 
 
 
 
 
 
 
 

Cruisers of the French Navy
Ships built in France
1884 ships